Konar Kuh (also Romanized as Konār Kūh, Kenar Kooh, and Kenār Kūh) is a village in Howmeh Rural District, in the Central District of Deylam County, Bushehr Province, Iran. At the 2006 census, its population was 327, in 69 families.

References 

Populated places in Deylam County